Captain America: Reborn is a six-issue (originally intended to be five issues) monthly comic book limited series published by Marvel Comics between July 2009 and January 2010.  The series was written by Ed Brubaker, illustrated by Bryan Hitch, and inked by Butch Guice. The series reveals the truth regarding the death of the original Captain America, Steve Rogers (as told in the story arc The Death of Captain America) and revives him in the contemporary Marvel Universe.

Background
The series was announced April 2009, with the title of "Reborn". More information was released on June 15, two days before the release of Captain America #600 (which serves as the prelude to the limited edition series). The complete title was later announced as Captain America: Reborn.

Plot

Captain America #600
On the first anniversary of Captain America's death, citizens disputed about whether to honor him as a patriot or to hate him for being a traitor. Throughout the series, Sharon Carter is looking for the agent she gave the gun to that was used to kill Steve Rogers. Using a device from Nick Fury, Sharon Carter tracks down the agent and hypnotizes him in order to make him reveal where he put the gun.

As Bucky reflects on what's happening to the country, Rikki Barnes tells Eli Bradley (aka Patriot) that she wants to be Bucky's new partner. Patriot agrees to introduce the two, even though Bucky is not looking for a new partner, because Steve would have wanted it. Meanwhile, Crossbones and Sin escape from a H.A.M.M.E.R. holding facility in Colorado, and the Red Skull returns still trapped in Aleksander Lukin's body. In Central Park, Falcon, Natasha (aka Black Widow), Bucky, Luke Cage, Jessica Drew, and Clint Barton are without their costumes. All have a teleportation spell ready in case Norman Osborn and his Dark Avengers attempt to capture them. Osborn, Sentry and the new Ms. Marvel manage to find the group while hovering over the park, Osborn decides not to attack them. Instead, Osborn appears in front of the crowd, and says that the gathering, thought to be illegal, was approved by H.A.M.M.E.R. Osborn declares that they will honor Captain America for who he was. The crowd shouts Captain America's name and it upsets the Avengers who were present. In the midst of this situation, Sharon Carter appears before the Avengers. She declares that there is still a way to save Steve.

Prelude
At the H.A.M.M.E.R. holding facility in Colorado, Sin is being questioned by H.A.M.M.E.R. agents about a second shooter in the murder of Captain America. They promise her freedom in exchange for the shooter. They figure that since the Red Skull is dead, she does not need to be loyal to him anymore. Sin laughs at this, and tackles a H.A.M.M.E.R agent, and whispers something in his ear. She is about to escape when Bullseye captures her. Later, Bullseye and Norman Osborn are talking with the agent Sin attacked, and he said that she whispered, "Why are you sure that he is dead?" Osborn declares that this is a problem, but the question is whether Sin was talking about her father or about Captain America.

Reborn
Sharon, Falcon, Vision, and Hank Pym are meeting at Hank's lab. While Bucky and Black Widow infiltrate a H.A.M.M.E.R. helicarrier, Sharon explains to everyone how she shot Captain America. However, when they examine the gun, which she recovered in Captain America #600, they discover that it is technology sponsored by none other than Doctor Doom. As Arnim Zola explains to Osborn during a meeting, the gun did not kill Steve, "[it] froze him within space and time." Sharon further explains she was captured by Red Skull and used as part of a device that would bring Steve back, or "unstick" him from time. No one is sure where Steve became unstuck when Sharon damaged the device. As Bucky and Black Widow are attacked by Ares and Venom, there are flashbacks to Steve Rogers on D-Day with Bucky, then his mother's death, and then back into D-Day. Steve questions what is happening to him, but appears to be preparing to go along with the situation and fight the battles of World War II all over again.

Norman Osborn approaches Sin and Crossbones about a mission. Captain America flashes to the point in time when he was subjected to the Super Soldier serum by Dr. Abraham Erskine. Meanwhile, Bucky and Black Widow have been apprehended by H.A.M.M.E.R. Agents. Norman Osborn then tells Black Widow to seek out Sharon Carter and order her to turn herself in before the current Captain America is also killed.

Captain America flashes to another point in his life where the Inuit have found his frozen body. He then flashes toward the Kree-Skrull War where he briefly talks with Vision. He gives Vision a message that Vision is commanded to forget until the time is right. Back in the present, Bucky is freed by Ant-Man and then rescued by Falcon who fights Ghost. Meanwhile, Sharon has turned herself in. At the same time, Sin and Crossbones locate the Red Skull and take him to Latveria so that he could be given a living body.

When they arrive in Latveria, Arnim Zola has created a machine that will bring back Captain America. Captain America is now at the point in time where he and Rick Jones (Bucky's alias) are fighting HYDRA. Back in the present, Norman Osborn holds a press conference about Sharon's surrender which is watched on the airplane where Victoria Hand has Sharon. At the Infinite Avengers Mansion, Mister Fantastic reveals to Henry Pym that the gun used to shoot Captain America used tachyon particles which are linked to the unidentified nanoparticles in Sharon's blood. He also theorizes that Captain America's body is somehow out-of-sync with their reality, which was why Sharon is the key to bringing him back. Suddenly, Vision interrupts them - it seems that Mister Fantastic's last statement has triggered a secret message in his deep storage memory banks which was left by Captain America himself. Once Vision shows the message to the two scientists, Mister Fantastic deduces that when Sharon destroyed the Skull's machine, it caused Rogers to be lost in time. Meanwhile, Ronin, Black Widow, and Bucky attack H.A.M.M.E.R.'s Mobile Data Collector demanding the whereabouts of Sharon. 

Sharon is brought into Latveria and hooked up to the device that she previously destroyed. The machine is connected to both Sharon and the Red Skull with the intent that it will transfer the Skull's consciousness into Steve Rogers mind when he re-appears. Meanwhile, Steve Rogers flashes to 1945 where he is at the English Channel Islands with Bucky attempting to stop the Nazis and Baron Heinrich Zemo from moving the drone plane armed with explosives. Captain America realizes that this is the same event at which they both get frozen and Bucky becomes the Winter Soldier. Then suddenly, he is pulled through his entire life and is returned to his proper reality. However, the Red Skull is now in control of Steve's body.

Aboard an Advanced Idea Mechanics (A.I.M.) transport ship, Sharon tries reaching out to Steve Rogers telling him to not "let [the Red Skull] win." Captain America responds by kicking her in the face. When Sharon argues that it is Norman Osborn who is "pulling the strings," Captain America then says he will be meeting with the president to inform him of his return after he takes care of the Avengers who have been tailing him in stealth for the last hour. 

Suddenly Vision phases through the transport ship's walls but is quickly frozen by Sin using a new weapon developed by Zola and A.I.M. The Avenger's Quinjet is then shot down, crashing in Washington D.C.'s Reflecting Pool. The A.I.M. transport lands and a battle then ensues between the Avengers and the A.I.M. agents. 

The real Steve Rogers, trapped inside his own mind, is in an alternate New York run by the Red Skull. After being discovered by Nazi soldiers, Steve escapes down a dark alley where he finds Uncle Sam posters, refashioned to the image of the Red Skull. Steve Rogers punches through the wall, where he catches the Red Skull off guard, and the two fight.

Aboard the transport ship, the Red Skull-controlled Captain America becomes disorientated from the mental attack of Steve Rogers. Captain America then informs Zola to release the shock troops: the Super M.O.D.O.K. Squadron (Mental Organism Designed Only for Killing)  led by Crossbones. Bucky spots Captain America and Sin emerging from the transport. Sin charges towards Bucky only to be knocked away by Bucky's shield. Upon the steps of the Lincoln Memorial, Captain America and Bucky fight while Steve Rogers and the Red Skull fight in the alternate New York. As they fight, the Red Skull reveals to Steve Rogers that it was, in fact, Sharon who had assassinated him. Steve Rogers passes it off as a lie. Sin then shoots Bucky in the back before Captain America takes the shield. Bucky draws his gun, with Captain America daring him to shoot. Bucky tries to reach out for Steve to give him a sign, but, in his hesitation, Bucky's bionic hand is cut off. Captain America takes Bucky by the throat and prepares to strike the killing blow.

During the battle, Henry Pym enters the Red Skull's ship and frees Sharon Carter. Meanwhile, Rogers, determined to stop the Skull at all costs, tackles the representation of his enemy's consciousness and begins to strangle him in hopes of killing his body. Surprised that Rogers would go that far, the Red Skull's consciousness evacuates Rogers' body, allowing Rogers to reassert control. The Red Skull returns to his robot body, just as Pym and Carter stop Arnim Zola from hacking into Vision's operating system.To prevent him from escaping the area, Sharon uses Pym's size changing technology to enlarge the Red Skull into a giant. While Rogers leads the Avengers into a coordinated attack on the giant menace and thus holding him in place, Vision accesses the ship's weapons systems and fires on the Red Skull. As the Red Skull falls against the attack, civilian bystanders see Rogers for the first time and cheer his return. Rogers is certain that the Red Skull's consciousness was destroyed along with the robot body. Black Widow reminds the team that Norman Osborn and his Avengers will be on the scene momentarily. So, they leave the area immediately. Back at the H.A.M.M.E.R. Helicarrier, Osborn is briefed on the incident, and begins his plans to deal with his newly strengthened enemies. He also comments on Sin's face, which now looks like her father's after the explosion. In Brooklyn, Rogers broods about the apocalyptic visions of the future he experienced and wonders how to avert it. As he ponders, Sharon arrives to take him to the party in his honor, but Rogers asks for one peaceful moment with her first.

Epilogue
The Captain America: Reborn series concludes with the one shot, Captain America: Who Will Wield the Shield? In Captain America's Brooklyn hideout, Bucky brainstorms ideas for a new costume. After Black Widow poses the question why there couldn't be two Captain Americas, Bucky states "there's only one Cap...and it's Steve Rogers." In another room, Sharon Carter expresses concerns about Steve not being able to sleep for the past four days. Steve explains that after the recent ordeal, he fears sleeping because he does not want to "skip away again." After not being able to devise a new costume, Black Widow convinces Bucky to don the flag and shield and "go out for one last hurrah." Steve leaves Sharon asleep as he too dons the flag and goes to the rooftop for some time to think. Steve sees Bucky and Black Widow leaving the loft on a motorcycle and follows them.

As Steve watches from the rooftop, Bucky and Black Widow confront Mister Hyde and other prisoners who had escaped from the Raft prison that morning. As Hyde is about to escape, Bucky spots Steve and throws the shield to him. Steve leaps from the building, grabs the shield, and dives into Hyde. Steve offers the shield back to Bucky who declines it. The two then take a stroll along the East River, where they discuss who will continue as Captain America. Steve expresses that he wants Bucky to continue as Captain America, even though Bucky explains he does not want to. Steve holds out the shield and asks Bucky to "do it for [him]." Bucky accepts. Back in the loft, Steve explains to Sharon that he couldn't tell Bucky the real reasons for letting him carry on as Captain America. After reliving the past and seeing the future, Steve fears Bucky would die if he did not continue as Captain America.

Steve visits the White House where he meets the president (although the president's name is not addressed and his face is never shown, the papers are signed 'Barack Obama') where he is granted a presidential pardon for the events of the Superhuman Registration Act. He then explains to the president that he is not ready to carry the shield. The president accepts, but states that he has a feeling that "this country's going to need to call on you for something much bigger...."

Bibliography
 Captain America #600
 Captain America: Reborn Prologue (online comic)
 Captain America: Reborn #1–6
 Captain America: Who Will Wield the Shield?

See also
 The Death of Captain America
 Fallen Son: The Death of Captain America

References

External links
Captain America: Reborn Main Site, June 15, 2009

2009 comics debuts
Captain America titles
Comics by Ed Brubaker
Widescreen comics
Captain America storylines